Prefeito Celso Daniel–Santo André, or informally known only as Santo André, is a train station on CPTM Line 10 (Turquoise), in the city of Santo André.

History

The station was opened on 16 February 1867, being part of Santos–Jundiaí Railway. At the time, it was named São Bernardo, as the city of Santo André "didn't exist yet" and the closest city was São Bernardo. However, the station was fundamental to what is the city of Santo André nowadays. The district was created in 1910 and promoted to city in 1938. However, the old designation was kept until 1934.

With the growing of the São Paulo Metropolitan Region, the station was slowly prioritizing the urban trains service. In 1975, from the 6,780,434 passengers of the station, 95% of them were from the called suburban trains. In 1977, the original station was demolished and, in 1979, a new structure was opened, which is the same until nowadays. The trains that stopped by the stations quitted traveling to Santos in 1996. In December 2002, after the murder of Mayor Celso Daniel, the station was renamed after him.

References

Companhia Paulista de Trens Metropolitanos stations
Railway stations opened in 1867
Railway stations opened in 1979